Pier Francesco Ferrero (1510–1566) was an Italian Roman Catholic abbot, bishop and cardinal.

Biography

Pier Francesco Ferrero was born in Biella in 1506, the son of Goffredo Ferrero, marquis of Bordolano, and his second wife Margherita Sanseverino, marchioness of Bordolano. He was the nephew of Cardinals Gianstefano Ferrero and Bonifacio Ferrero.  His older brother, Filiberto Ferrero, also became a cardinal, as did his nephew, Guido Luca Ferrero.

From 1527 to 1550, he was the Abbot of San Stefano, Vercelli.  On December 20, 1536, he was elected Bishop of Vercelli.  In 1540, he served as vice-legate to Bologna when his uncle Cardinal Bonifacio Ferrero was legate.  He served as a delegate to the Council of Trent in 1552.  In 1557, he was auditor of Cardinal Carlo Carafa in Brussels.  He was nuncio to the Republic of Venice from 1560 to March 1, 1561.

Pope Pius IV made him a cardinal priest in the consistory of February 26, 1561.  He received the red hat and the titular church of San Cesareo in Palatio on June 3, 1561.  On November 10, 1561, he opted for the titular church of Sant'Agnese in Agone.  He resigned the government of the Diocese of Vercelli on May 2, 1562.  On October 7, 1566, he opted for the titular church of Sant'Anastasia.

He died in Rome on November 14, 1566.  He was buried in the Basilica di Santa Maria Maggiore.

See also
Catholic Church in Italy

References

1510 births
1566 deaths
16th-century Italian cardinals
People from Biella